Bukooli is one of the six traditional chiefdoms of the kingdom of Busoga in Uganda.

It was founded before 1737 and became a part of the British protectorate in Busoga in 1896. Its ruler is known as the Wakooli.

References 

Busoga